Valley High School is a four-year public secondary school located in Hazelton, Idaho, U.S.A. It is the main high school operated by the Valley School District, serving several rural communities in eastern Jerome County.

Athletics

Valley High School is classified as a D1 school (enrollment between 160 and 319 in grades 9–12) by the IHSAA. It currently competes in the Canyon Conference against Declo and Wendell.  !

The school colors are royal blue and white and   Vikings is the mascot.

See also

List of high schools in Idaho

References

External links 
Valley School District #262

Public high schools in Idaho
Schools in Jerome County, Idaho